Chelyabinsk Oblast is a federal subject (an oblast) of Russia in the Ural Mountains region, on the border of Europe and Asia. Its administrative center is the city of Chelyabinsk. Its population is 3,431,224. (2021 Census).

History
During the Middle Ages, Bashkir tribes inhabited the Southern Urals; they formed part of the Golden Horde, Nogai Horde, and smaller Bashkir unions. The Tsardom of Russia incorporated the area in the late 16th century. Many cities of Chelyabinsk Oblast, including the city of Chelyabinsk itself, trace their history back to those forts.

The period from the 1750s to the 1770s saw the emergence of industrial enterprises in the Southern Urals when the first factory-centered towns like Miass, Kyshtym, and Zlatoust were founded. After the Southern Urals recovered from the Pugachev's Rebellion of 1773–1775, the territory of modern-day Chelyabinsk Oblast started to attract more people from the European part of Russia. By the mid-19th century Chelyabinsk was a major trade center in the Urals, and after the construction of the Trans-Siberian Railway in the 1890s, it became an important transport hub that connected Siberia to the rest of the Russian Empire.

In 1919, Chelyabinsk became the regional capital of the newly formed Chelyabinsk Governorate of the Russian SFSR, which combined eastern portions of the Orenburg Governorate with Kurgan of the Tobolsk Governorate. At this time, the population of the new region has already exceeded one million people. In 1923, together with the Perm,  and Tyumen governorates, it merged into a single Ural Oblast that lasted only ten years, until 1934. On January 17, 1934, Chelyabinsk Oblast was finally established. Its current boundaries were formed when Kurgan Oblast was detached from it in 1943.

Soviet industrialization
During the 1930s the regional economy and industrial output grew as Chelyabinsk Oblast became a key focus of the First Five-Year Plan. Key factories and enterprises that formed the core of the modern Chelyabinsk economy, including the Magnitogorsk Iron and Steel Works, the Chelyabinsk Tractor Plant and the Chelyabinsk Metallurgical Plant, originated at this time. The economy continued to grow after the outbreak of the Great Patriotic War in 1941, as industries evacuated from the western parts of the Soviet Union to the Urals, and to Chelyabinsk Oblast in particular. During the war, Magnitogorsk alone produced one third of all Soviet steel, while the city of Chelyabinsk became the main center of Soviet tank production, earning the nickname "Tankograd" (Tank City).

Nuclear research
Chelyabinsk Oblast has been associated with top-secret nuclear research since the 1940s. While there are no nuclear power stations in Chelyabinsk, a number of production reactors were located there starting with the early Cold War. A serious nuclear accident occurred in 1957 at the Mayak nuclear fuel reprocessing plant, 150 km north-west of the city, which led to evacuations and fatalities throughout the oblast, although not in Chelyabinsk city. The province was closed to all foreigners until 1992, with the sole exception of allowing a British medical team in following a two-train rail explosion in the mid-1980s.

Sławomir Grünberg has made the documentary Chelyabinsk: The Most Contaminated Spot on the Planet (1994) about the unsafe dumping of radioactive waste in the Techa River and in Lake Karachay.

Recent history
On 4 July 1997, Chelyabinsk, alongside Bryansk, Magadan, Saratov, and Vologda signed a power-sharing agreement with the government of Russia, granting it autonomy. The agreement would be abolished on 2 February 2002.

On February 15, 2013, a 10,000 ton meteoroid entered the Earth's atmosphere over Russia at about 09:20 YEKT (03:20 UTC). It passed over the southern Ural region and exploded in a meteor air burst over Chelyabinsk Oblast. About 1,500 people were reported injured, including 311 children. Health officials said 112 people had been hospitalized, mainly from injuries caused by glass from windows shattered by a shock wave; two were reported to be in serious condition. As many as 3,000 buildings in six cities across the region were damaged by the explosion and impacts. The meteor created a dazzling light as it air burst, bright enough to cast shadows during broad daylight in Chelyabinsk.

Economy
The largest companies in the region include Magnitogorsk Iron and Steel Works, Chelyabinsk Metallurgical Plant (Mechel group), Chelyabinsk Pipe Rolling Plant, Chelyabinsk Electrometallurgical Plant, Chelyabinsk Zinc Plant, Ashinsky Metallurgical Plant.

Geography
Chelyabinsk Oblast is on the eastern slope of the Southern Urals. Only a small part of the territory to the west is on the western slopes of the Southern Urals.

Chelyabinsk Oblast is situated in the Southern Urals, near Kurgan and Sverdlovsk oblast. Most of the Oblast is located to the east of the Ural Mountains, which form the continental boundary between Asia and Europe. This boundary is marked by a stone pillar at the Uraltau pass near the Urzhumka station (8 km from Zlatoust), which has "Europe" written on one side and "Asia" on the other. In Chelyabinsk Oblast, Zlatoust city, Katav-Ivanovsk, and Satka are located in Europe, while Chelyabinsk, Troitsk, and Miass are in Asia. Magnitogorsk is located on both continents.

The area of Chelyabinsk Oblast is 88,900 km2. The total length of its external border is 2750 km, and the Oblast measures 400 km from north to south and 490 km from west to east.

It also borders the country of Kazakhstan, specifically the Kostanay Region.

Relief
Chelyabinsk Oblast has a very diverse landscape, ranging from lowlands and hilly plains to mountain ranges with peaks exceeding 1,000 m, including Nurgush mountain (1406 m). The mountainous area has several ski resorts.

The West Siberian Plain is bounded on the west horizontal (elevation 190 m above sea level), which passes through the village of Bagaryak, Kunashak and continues through Chelyabinsk to the south. The lowlands are located in the northeast, and the elevation drops to 130 m in the eastern border region.

Hydrology
Numerous rivers originate within the region, within the basins of the Kama, Tobol, and Ural rivers. The region is home to 348 rivers longer than 10 km (totaling 10,235 km in length), 17 of which are over 100 km in length. Seven rivers, the Miass, Uy, Ural, Ay, Ufa, Uvelka, and Gumbeyka, pass through the area and are longer than 200 km.

Chelyabinsk Oblast is also home to more than 3,748 lakes, mostly located in the north and east and covering a total area of 2125 km2. Many of the lakes in this area, including Lake Turgoyak, Zyuratkul, and Lake Itkul, are famous for their clear waters and attract tourism. Some of the lakes in the eastern foothills have tectonic origins as water accumulated in tectonic failures (basins), resulting in very deep lakes that can reach 30–40 m.

Sights

Taganay National Park
Taganay National Park is located northeast of the city of Zlatoust, Chelyabinsk Oblast. Taganay National Park is a popular tourist destination in the Urals. The park contains mountain ranges, alpine meadows, stone outcrops and a several kilometer stone river, forests, woodlands and mountain tundra, ancient mineral mines and mountain rivers flowing both to Europe and Asia. Taganay National Park was established on March 5, 1991, the first in the Urals.

Gagarin Park

Gagarin Central Park is a 12-hectare recreational space in Chelyabinsk. The park is named after Yuri Gagarin, a Soviet cosmonaut and the first person to enter space. The park contains forest walks, lakes, old quarries, and landscaped gardens. There is also a showground with rides.

Monuments 
There are several monuments in Chelyabinsk, many of which are on Kirovka street, a pedestrian street in the center of Chelyabinsk. The monuments include a monument to Igor Kurchatov, a nuclear scientist, which opened in 1986 to the 250th anniversary of Chelyabinsk; a monument to Orlenok, on the Aloe polye in Chelyabinsk, which opened on October 29, 1958 on the day of the fortieth anniversary of the Komsomol; the Sculpture of the Postman; the Memorial to Law and Order Soldiers; the Monument to Soldiers-Internationalists; and a sculpture of a firefighter.

Politics

During the Soviet period, the highest authority in the Oblast was shared between three positions: the First Secretary of the Chelyabinsk CPSU Committee (who held the most power), the Chairman of the Oblast Soviet (legislative power), and the Chairman of the Oblast Executive Committee (executive power). Since the dissolution of the Soviet Union in 1991, the CPSU lost its monopoly on power.

Today, the Charter of Chelyabinsk Oblast governs the political structure of the region. The Legislative Assembly of Chelyabinsk Oblast serves as the province's regional parliament and exercises legislative authority, with the power to pass laws, resolutions, and other legal acts and oversee their implementation and observance. The Oblast Government, led by the Governor of Chelyabinsk Oblast, is the highest executive body in the region, and includes territorial executive bodies such as district administrations, committees, and commissions that facilitate development and run the day-to-day matters of the province.

Administrative divisions

Demographics
Population:

Settlements

Chelyabinsk Oblast is highly urbanized.

Ethnic groups
According to the 2010 Census, the Oblast's ethnic composition was:
2,829,899 Russians (83.8%);
180,913 Tatars (5.4%);
162,513 Bashkirs (4.8%);
50,081 Ukrainians (1.5%);
35,297 Kazakhs (1.05%);
18,687 Germans (0.5%);
13,035 Belarusians (0.4%);
12,147 Mordvins (0.2%);
9,311 Armenians (0.3%);
65,190 others (1.6);
99,144 people were registered from administrative databases, and could not declare an ethnicity. It is estimated that the proportion of ethnicities in this group is the same as that of the declared group.
Births (2011): 47,300 (13.6 per 1000)
Deaths (2011): 49,469 (14.2 per 1000)

Vital statistics
Vital statistics for 2012
Births: 49 885 (14.3 per 1000)
Deaths: 49 367 (14.2 per 1000)
Total fertility rate:
 
2009 - 1.63 | 2010 - 1.65 | 2011 - 1.70 | 2012 - 1.81 | 2013 - 1.80 | 2014 - 1.86 | 2015 - 1.84 | 2016 - 1.81(e)

Vital statistics for 2008
Source:

Religion

According to a 2012 survey, 30.9% of the population of Chelyabinsk Oblast adheres to the Russian Orthodox Church, 8% are unaffiliated generic Christians, 5% adheres to other Eastern Orthodox Churches, 8% of the population is Muslim, 1% adheres to Slavic Rodnovery (Slavic Neopaganism), and 0.4% to forms of Hinduism (Vedism, Krishnaism or Tantrism). In addition, 29% of the population deems itself to be "spiritual but not religious", 14% is atheist, and 4.7% follows other religions or did not give an answer to the question.

See also 

List of Chairmen of the Legislative Assembly of Chelyabinsk Oblast

References

Sources

External links

Reddatabook of Chelyabinsk Oblast
Regional Development Agency of Chelyabinsk region

 
States and territories established in 1934